Regadi Doswada (Village ID 574712) is a village and panchayat in Ranga Reddy district, AP, India. It falls under Shabad mandal. According to the 2011 census it has a population of 1892 living in 432 households. Its main agriculture product are cotton and vegetables growing.

References

Villages in Ranga Reddy district